Area codes 707 and 369 are telephone area codes in the North American Numbering Plan (NANP) for the northwestern part of the U.S. state of California. The area codes serve part of the northern San Francisco Bay Area, as well as the North Coast. Major cities in the area codes include Napa, Sebastopol, Vallejo, Benicia, Fairfield, Santa Rosa, Windsor, Healdsburg, Rohnert Park, Petaluma, Fort Bragg, Rio Vista, Crescent City, Eureka, Clearlake, Vacaville, Dixon, and Ukiah. 707 was created by a split of area code 415 on March 1, 1959. Area code 369 was added to the numbering plan area (NPA) on February 1, 2023, to form an overlay numbering plan in the service area.

History
When the American Telephone and Telegraph Company (AT&T) devised the first comprehensive telephone numbering plan for the North American continent in 1947, the far northern part of California received area code 916, with the exclusion of the city of Sacramento, which used area code 415. California area codes were reorganized geographically in 1950, so that 916 was assigned to a numbering plan area that comprised only the northeastern part from the Sierra Nevada to the Central Valley. The coastal area to the west was assigned area code 415. With this change, Sacramento was also changed to area code 916.

On March 1, 1959, numbering plan area 415 was divided in a flash-cut (without permissive dialing period) in which the northern part of the numbering plan area (Solano County and north thereof) received area code 707, which was California's eighth area code (along with 213, 415, 916, 714, 408, 805, and 209), and the last new area code in the state until 619 was added in 1982.

When area code 530 was split from area code 916 on November 1, 1997, the Dixon area was renumbered from area code 916 to 707 and switched from the Sacramento local access and transport area (LATA) into the San Francisco LATA.

707 was the last of California's thirteen area codes, having only 0 or 1 in middle position, the others being 310, 510, 818 and 909, all of which, in addition to 619, were introduced decades after 707's debut) to require relief from a "new format" area code (those with 2–8 as their middle digit, which were introduced beginning in 1995 when the NANP ran out of the original format NPAs), despite explosive growth in the area, particularly its southern portion, as well as the proliferation of cell phones and pagers.

In 1999, a three-way, two-phase split of area code 707 was scheduled by Pacific Bell such that a new area code (627) would have served most of Napa and Sonoma Counties and small portions of Marin and Mendocino Counties, while another new area code (369) would have served Solano County as well as a small portion of Napa County, beginning in December 2000 and October 2001, respectively. However, due to the success of number pooling in preserving numbering resources, the California Public Utilities Commission cancelled these actions on July 27, 2000. Still, after twenty more years of continued growth in the region, it was determined that 707 would indeed require relief. On August 1, 2022, the NANP Administrator set the effective implementation date of the overlay of 707 by 369 to February 1, 2023,

Prior to October 2021, area code 707 had telephone numbers assigned for the central office code 988. In 2020, 988 was designated nationwide as a dialing code for the National Suicide Prevention Lifeline, which created a conflict for exchanges that permit seven-digit dialing. This area code was therefore scheduled to transition to ten-digit dialing by October 24, 2021.

Service area

Del Norte County

Bertsch-Oceanview
Crescent City
Crescent City North
Fort Dick
Gasquet
Hiouchi
Klamath
Northcrest
Pelican Bay State Prison
Smith River

Humboldt County

Alderpoint
Alton
Arcata
Bayside
Bayview
Blocksburg
Blue Lake
Bridgeville
Carlotta
Cutten
Eureka
Fernbridge
Ferndale
Fieldbrook
Fields Landing
Fortuna
Garberville
Honeydew
Humboldt Hill
Hydesville
Loleta
Kneeland
Korbel
Manila
McKinleyville
Miranda
Myers Flat
Myrtletown
Orick
Pepperwood
Petrolia
Phillipsville
Pine Hills
Redcrest
Redway
Rio Dell
Samoa
Scotia
Shelter Cove
Trinidad
Weott
Westhaven-Moonstone
Willow Creek
Whitethorn

Lake County

Clearlake
Clearlake Oaks
Clearlake Park
Clearlake Rivieras
Cobb
Finley
Glenhaven
Hidden Valley Lake
Kelseyville
Lake Pillsbury
Lakeport
Loch Lomond
Lower Lake
Lucerne
Middletown
Nice
North Lakeport
Sulphur Bank Rancheria
Upper Lake
Whispering Pines
Witter Springs

Marin County

Dillon Beach
Fallon
Tomales

Mendocino County

Albion
Boonville
Branscomb
Calpella
Caspar
Cleone
Comptche
Covelo
Dos Rios
Elk
Fort Bragg
Gualala
Hopland
Inglenook
Keene Summit
Laytonville
Leggett
Little River
Manchester
Mendocino
Navarro
Noyo
Philo
Piercy
Point Arena
Potter Valley
Pudding Creek
Redwood Lodge
Redwood Valley
Rockport
Sherwood Valley Rancheria
Talmage
Ukiah
Westport
Willits
Yorkville

Napa County

Aetna Springs
American Canyon
Angwin
Calistoga
Circle Oaks
Deer Park
Napa
Oakville
Pope Valley
Rutherford
Spanish Flat
St. Helena
Vichy Springs
Yountville
Zinfandel

Solano County

Benicia
Birds Landing
Collinsville
Cordelia
Dixon
Elmira
Fairfield
Green Valley
Liberty Farms
Rio Vista
Suisun City
Travis AFB
Vacaville
Vallejo

Sonoma County

Asti
Bloomfield
Bodega Bay
Bodega
Boyes Hot Springs
Camp Meeker
Carmet
Cazadero
Cloverdale
Cotati
Duncans Mills
El Verano
Eldridge
Fetters Hot Springs-Agua Caliente
Forestville
Fort Ross
Fulton
Freestone
Geyserville
Glen Ellen
Graton
Guerneville
Guernewood Park
Healdsburg
Jenner
Kenwood
Korbel
Lakeville
Larkfield-Wikiup
Mark West Springs
Mark West
Monte Rio
Occidental
Penngrove
Petaluma
Rio Dell
Rio Nido
Rohnert Park
Roseland
Salmon Creek
Santa Rosa
Schellville
Sea Ranch
Sebastopol
Sonoma
Stewarts Point
Temelec
Two Rock
Valley Ford
Villa Grande
Vineburg
Windsor

Trinity County
Mad River
Ruth
Zenia

See also
List of California area codes

References

External links
 

707
707
707
707
707
707
707
707
Northern California
707
1959 establishments in California